The British Rail Class 25, also known as the Sulzer Type 2, is a class of 327 diesel locomotives built between 1961 and 1967 for British Rail. They were numbered in two series, D5151–D5299 and D7500–D7677.

The first 25 locos became known as Class 25/0 and were built at BR Darlington Works. The Class 25/1 locomotives were built at Darlington and BR Derby Works. The Class 25/2 locomotives were built at Derby with some built at Darlington. The final batch of locomotives were designated Class 25/3 and built by Derby Works and Beyer, Peacock and Company of Manchester.

Background

The Class 25s were primarily designed for freight work, but a significant number were fitted with boilers for heating passenger trains. Throughout the 1970s they could be found at work across the whole of the British Rail network although the Eastern and Southern Regions never had a long-term allocation.  Though regular performers into the early 1980s on Crewe–Cardiff passenger trains, they are best known in that respect for their use on the summer Saturday trains to Aberystwyth, a task they relinquished in 1984. The final Class 25 locomotive was withdrawn from operational service in March 1987 although it continued to be used on enthusiast specials until March 1991.

Production and classification

Class 25/0
Number sequence (original) D5151–D5175, (TOPS) 25 001–25 025

The first 25 locos became known as Class 25/0 and were built at the BR Darlington works using the newer  "B" engine, modified generator assembly and traction motors. This increase in power was obtained from an air/water free flow intercooler fitted between a higher capacity pressure charger and inlet manifold, included within the normal cooling circuit to maintain simplicity. The cylinder head was also modified and strengthened.

The generator supplied four BTH 137BX traction motors connected in parallel and rated , 545 V, 375 A at 560 rpm with a gear ratio of 18:79 (to give a  maximum speed).

Class 25/1

Number sequence (original) D5176–D5232, (TOPS) 25 026–25 082

The Class 25/1 locomotives were built at BR Darlington and Derby locomotive works. They featured the new AEI 253AY traction motor, a result of the collaboration between BTH, MV and American builder Alco. This smaller, lighter motor was an attempt to market a traction motor to a worldwide audience, especially to the  metre gauge lines. For Class 25 locomotives these lighter motors meant the discontinuance of other weight saving measures being built into the design. They were highly rated in an attempt to overcome the loss of tractive effort normally found on starting. The field divert system was also modified to allow increased capability throughout all the speed ranges.

Pairs of motors connected in series provided a higher maximum tractive effort (usually quoted as  although  could be achieved) but the downside being that a series pair connected machine was more prone to slipping than one with an all parallel grouping. The traction motor's continuous rating of 650 amps was not far removed from its one-hour short term or 'emergency' rating of 680 amps, and this could only be monitored manually. On heavy trains close monitoring of the ammeters was necessary to avoid motor damage. Though the body shell remained similar to D5151 there were a number of refinements. The air horns were relocated to either side of the headcode panel. The cab skirt and body fairing were discontinued, though the support lugs remained. A new driving control panel was fitted.

There were initially two variants of this sub-class. The vast majority were boilered and designated 251 AV. The four without train heating were designated 251 BV. In due course, when it was decided to fit dual braking to a number of locomotives, those previously 251 AV became 251 CX and one of the 251 BV (25032) became 251 DX.

Class 25/2
Number sequence (original) D5233–D5299, D7500–D7597 (TOPS) 25 083–25 247

The Class 25/2 locomotives featured restyled bodywork and two-tone green livery similar to that carried by the Brush Type 4 (Class 47). The majority were built at BR Derby. The redesign principally affected two areas, the cab and the location of the air intakes. The gangway doors fitted to the earlier examples were rarely used, their presence adding to the complaints of noise and draughts in the cabs and the removal of these allowed the centre windscreen to be enlarged, so that its lower edge lined up with the windscreens on either side giving a noticeably different front end look. The removal of the air filters from the side air louvers to the cantrail was the result of a comparison carried out at Inverness between a batch of Derby built Type 2s and a batch of BRCW Type 2s (Class 26 and Class 27), the tests targeting the air quality within the engine room. These tests revealed the location of the grilles on the Derby build allowed for much more debris to reach the filters (especially the lower ones), clogging them quicker, leading to poorer air quality within the engine compartment, and so potentially affecting performance and engine wear. With such a large order to be completed it was felt that a redesign of these areas would have cost savings in the long run, in addition to a better working environment within the cabs, and with a general less cluttered look about the locomotive's exterior.

Some class 25/2s were built at Darlington works, including D7597 (later 25247) which was the last locomotive to be built at Darlington.  The 25/2s built at Darlington had the original bodywork, not the restyled design.

There were six variants of this sub-class, reflecting that locos were boilered and/or vacuum braked and/or dual braked. Boiler fitted locomotives included the first five (252 AV) and final thirty Class 25/2 (252 DV). Only members of the latter batch were modified for dual brake operation becoming 252 CX with the exception of 25242 that had had its boiler removed and was designated 252 FX. The non-boilered vacuum braked locos were 252 BV and when dual braked became 252 EX.

Class 25/3
Number sequence (original) D7598–D7677 (TOPS) 25 248–25 327

The final batch of locomotives were designated Class 25/3 and was to be built by BR's Derby Works and Beyer, Peacock and Company of Manchester. However, because of financial problems Beyer, Peacock was unable to complete the final 18 locomotives and these were transferred to BR Derby for construction.

Though these locomotives still carried a RTB 15656 generator, this variant was a ten pole machine with a modified assembly incompatible with earlier equipment. The regulated (full hp) part of its characteristic was substantially the same as before but the unloading point, that is the point at which full power could no longer be utilised, was altered to 900 A, 910 V (819 kW) from 1,050 A, 780 V (819 kW).

The latter half of the 1960s had seen the widespread introduction of solid state electronics and these locomotives incorporated a control system where speed was detected electronically rather than mechanically. A signal from a tachogenerator was used to close contactors in sequence at given speeds to activate the motor's field weakening process, rather than through contacts and relays as in earlier types. The control system ensured the traction motors and main generator were all operated within the continuous rating of the machines except in full field conditions when the driver was able to judge how long to remain in the short-term rating condition.
There were two variants of the Class 25/3 sub-class. Early 25/3 AV locomotives were fitted with vacuum brakes and in due course many of these were dual braked and redesignated 25/3 BX. By the time the last few locomotives were under construction dual braking had become the norm and ten of the last batch from Derby were built new as 25/3 BX locomotives for work out of Willesden on the recently upgraded West Coast Main Line.

Class 25/9

At the end of 1985 twelve of the remaining Class 25/3 locomotives were designated as 25/9, the intention being that they would operate on traffic won for the Industrial Minerals Division of Railfreight that included salt for road gritting from the ICI mine at Winsford. The locos were selected from the available pool of Class 25 locomotives in March 1985 with the expectation of three more years of service before 10,000 running hours since last Works attention would be reached and their maintenance would be concentrated at Carlisle Kingmoor TMD. At that point the expected cascade of motive power on BR as a whole would see them replaced by Class 31 locomotives. However, the traffic they were designated for was not captured and in due course the sub-class were withdrawn along with the other members.

Train Heating Units

Three Class 25/3 locomotives were converted in 1983 at Aberdeen Ferryhill Depot for use as mobile generators to provide electric heating on trains where the hauling locomotive could not supply this. As part of the modifications the traction motors were removed and ETH sockets fitted. The engine was set to run at 640 rpm when providing heat, compared with the idle speed of 325 rpm, and the full engine speed on a non-modified Class 25 of 750 rpm.

They were given departmental numbers 97250 / 97251 / 97252 (formerly 25310 / 25305 / 25314). They were referred to as ETHEL units (Electric Train Heating Ex-Locomotives), and unofficially named Ethel 1, Ethel 2 and Ethel 3. They were painted in a blue/grey livery in an effort to match the coaching stock livery of the day. After use in Scotland, two of the units (Ethel 2 and Ethel 3) moved to London for heating stock hauled by main line steam locomotives, and two were painted in the then current InterCity Executive livery (nicknamed 'raspberry ripple') to match BR's Special Trains Unit's Mk1 coaches.  Ethel 1 was withdrawn in 1987, the other two in 1990. All three were scrapped in 1994.

Prototype

In 1962 Sulzer designed and began development of a prototype diesel engine for higher outputs based on the LDA range. In the end development was terminated and the locomotive set aside for its use, D5299, was completed as a standard Class 25/2.

Operation
The Class 25 locomotives were initially delivered to London Midland and Scottish regions while the Western Region had Class 22s to operate in the type 2 power classification. With the withdrawal of all diesel-hydraulic locomotives planned, there was a perceived gap in this power range, and locomotive 7657 worked trial trips between Exeter and Barnstaple in August 1971 resulting in the WR Chief Civil Engineer approving the use of the class as a direct replacement in the West of England.

The last operational Class 25 was 25322 which was withdrawn on 23 March 1987. It was then restored by apprentices at Leeds Holbeck shed including repainting in BR two-tone green and having its original number of D7672 applied. In this form it worked railtours over the Settle–Carlisle line between 1989 and 1991.

Preservation

Twenty Class 25s have survived in preservation, of all sub-types except Class 25/0. Twelve members of this class were rescued from Vic Berry's Scrapyard during the late 1980s. They include D5185 aka 25035 Castell Dinas Brân, D5207 aka 25057, D5209 aka 25059, D5222 aka 25072, D7523 aka 25173 John F Kennedy, D7541 aka 25191, D7594 aka 25244, D7615 aka 25265 Harlech Castle, D7628 aka 25278 Sybilla, D7659 aka 25309, D7629 aka 25279, D7663 aka 25313 and D7633 aka 25904(25283). D7612 was sent to MC Metals before entering preservation.

The class returned to the main line in October 2007 when D7628 (25278) worked from the North Yorkshire Moors Railway to and from Whitby station.

Liveries

Nicknames
Railfans nicknamed the class Rats, as it was alleged they could be seen everywhere in Britain, and hence were "as common as rats".  They were also known, mostly by their drivers, as Spluts, owing to their habit of spluttering when they broke down, which they often did.

Model railways 
In 1977 Hornby Railways launched its first version of the BR Class 25 in OO gauge. This was followed by Bachmann (OO), Heljan (O and OO) and Sutton's Locomotive Workshops (OO, EM, P4)

References

Citations

References

Unreferenced source literature
 
 
 
 
 

 Rail Express Magazine, Issues 1 and 2, June/July 1996
 Ian Allan ABC of British Railways Locomotives, summer 1966 edition

Further reading

External links

 Caledonian Railway Diesel Group.
 DerbySulzers.com: BR/Sulzer Type 2 locomotives
 Class25.info: Class 25 locomotives In Action
 D7629.com: Class 25 Detailed information, History, Operation
 : South Devon Railway Locomotive List

25
Bo-Bo locomotives
Beyer, Peacock locomotives
Railway locomotives introduced in 1961
Standard gauge locomotives of Great Britain
Diesel-electric locomotives of Great Britain